Steve La Porte is a makeup artist. He won at the 61st Academy Awards in the category of Best Makeup for his work on Beetlejuice. He shared his Oscar with Ve Neill and Robert Short.

He is also known for his work on TV, for shows such as LOST and The X-Files.

He has worked on over 80 films and TV shows since his start in 1980.

References

External links

Best Makeup Academy Award winners
Living people
Artists from Oklahoma City
Year of birth missing (living people)
American make-up artists
Emmy Award winners